Gabrielle Jeannette Hanna (born February 7, 1991) is an American Internet personality and singer-songwriter. She rose to prominence on the video platforms Vine and YouTube before releasing her debut single, "Out Loud", in 2017. Her debut extended play, 2WayMirror, was released on May 31, 2019, and her second EP, Bad Karma, was released on May 15, 2020. Her debut album, Trauma Queen, was released on July 22, 2022.

Hanna has also published two poetry books, Adultolescence (2017) and Dandelion (2020), both of which are New York Times Best Sellers.

Early life
Hanna was born on February 7, 1991, in New Castle, Pennsylvania. She has six siblings and is of Lebanese, French, and Polish descent. In 2013, Hanna graduated from the University of Pittsburgh with a degree in psychology and communications. While at Pitt, she was a member of Sigma Sigma Sigma sorority. After college, she worked for a marketing company that sold products out of a Sam's Club; she became the top salesperson in the US for the company and moved to Cleveland, Ohio, to help start a new branch of the company. However, she departed after realizing that they relied on a pyramid scheme.

Career
Hanna began uploading skits to Vine in late 2013 and later gained recognition for her activity on the Vine app, where she accumulated around five million followers. In 2014, she set up a YouTube channel under the name The Gabbie Show, which was changed to Gabbie Hanna in 2019, but later changed back to The Gabbie Show in 2021.

In 2015, Hanna and partner Matt Steffanina won the fourth season of the dance competition web-series Dance Showdown. After college, Hanna moved to Los Angeles, California, to work with internet media company BuzzFeed, but eventually left to focus on her YouTube and Vine platforms. In December 2015, a video accusing Gabbie Hanna of stealing jokes went viral on Reddit. In Hanna's response to these claims, she states she "never have and never will consider [herself] a comedian".

After Vine shut down in 2016, Hanna focused on YouTube. Meanwhile, she was nominated for two Teen Choice Awards — Choice Web Star: Female and Choice Viner. In late 2016, Hanna joined the lip sync tour Drop the Mic alongside other YouTubers.

In 2017, Hanna released a book of poetry, Adultolescence (2017). Around the same time, she premiered her debut single "Out Loud" along with its music video and announced plans to release an album. A few months later, Creative Artists Agency signed Hanna and she joined MTV's social media team. In June 2017, Hanna joined the main cast of web series Escape the Night as the vaudevillian and appeared in seven episodes. She co-hosted the revival of Total Request Live in October 2017. In November 2017, she released a non-album single "Satellite" with an accompanying lyrics video.

In January 2018, Hanna was nominated for YouTuber of the Year at the 10th Shorty Awards and for the Social Star Award at the 2018 iHeartRadio Music Awards. Hanna released her third single "Honestly" and its encore "Honestly (Encore)" in August 2018. At the eighth Annual Streamy Awards, Hanna won an award for Storyteller and was nominated for First Person and Audience Choice: Creator of the Year. On a 2018 interview on Genius' Verified, she sang her song "Monster" a cappella but due to technical errors, the microphone was unable to record her voice properly. Fans spliced in clips, including vines and voice distortions, at the point of technical error to create a meme. Hanna has since released merchandise showcasing her singing face during the meme.

On February 2, 2019, Hanna released "Medicate", the first single from her debut extended play titled 2WayMirror. On May 31, 2019, 2WayMirror was released. For a period of time after the songs' release, Hanna peaked at number 5 on Billboard's Top Emerging Artists chart. Hanna reprised her role in the fourth season of Escape the Night and portrayed a Hollywood Star. She was nominated for Choice Comedy Web Star at the 2019 Teen Choice Awards. Hanna headlined at the inaugural Patreon Assembly on November 2, 2019. On November 16, 2019, Hanna released the music video for her song "Broken Girls".

The first single from Hanna's second EP, Bad Karma, "Dandelion", was released on April 17, 2020, and the second single, "Glass House", was released on May 1, 2020. The EP was released on May 15, 2020. On October 13, 2020, Hanna released a new book of poetry, Dandelion (2020), named after the lead single of Bad Karma.

After many public controversies, Hanna took an extended break from social media on a few different occasions. To celebrate New Years 2022, Hanna returned to social media and released "Rewired", a single from her upcoming album. She later announced that she had entirely deserted This Time Next Year and her new upcoming debut album would be released on July 22, 2022 and was called Trauma Queen, putting the album up for pre-order, as well as restarting and rebranding her podcast. Hanna hosted her first live performance since November 2019 on February 22, 2022. In late August 2022, Hanna sparked global conversation around mental health challenges by publishing hundreds of controversial social media posts in only a few days.

Filmography

Film and television

Discography

Studio albums

Extended plays

Singles

As lead artist

Promotional singles

Guest appearances

Videography

Awards and nominations

Bibliography

Notes

References

External links
 
 

1991 births
21st-century American poets
21st-century American singers
21st-century American women singers
21st-century American women writers
American people of French descent
American people of Lebanese descent
American people of Polish descent
American pop singers
American rock singers
American rock songwriters
American TikTokers
American women poets
American women singer-songwriters
American YouTubers
Living people
People from New Castle, Pennsylvania
Poets from Pennsylvania
Pop punk singers
Singers from Pennsylvania
Social media influencers
University of Pittsburgh alumni
Vine (service) celebrities
YouTube channels launched in 2014